Bo'ness United Football Club is a Scottish football club, based in the town of Bo'ness. The team plays in the  after winning the East of Scotland and gaining SFA membership in 2020. They presently play their home games at Newtown Park, which holds 2,500 spectators and has been used as a football ground since the 1880s. They play in blue.

Bo'ness like many other clubs moved from the junior leagues in 2018. The club won the Scottish Junior Cup on three occasions, in 1948, 1976 and 1984, and lifted the 2018-19 East of Scotland League Cup defeating Musselburgh Athletic 1–0.

History 
Nicknamed the B.U.'s, Bo'ness United were formed in 1945, at the end of the Second World War when Bo'ness, a club that had played in the senior ranks, being a member of the Scottish Football League from 1921 to 1932, merged with the Junior club Bo'ness Cadora.

The club won the Scottish Junior Cup on three occasions, in 1948, 1976 and 1984.

As a result of winning the 2009–10 East Region Super League, United competed in the Scottish Cup for the first time the following season. The club eventually reached the third round, defeating Scottish Football League Third Division side Queen's Park at home in round two. They also reached the third round the following year.

United moved to the East of Scotland Football League in 2018, along with many other East Region junior clubs.

Lowland League 
The club were promoted to the Lowland League after winning the East of Scotland and gaining SFA membership in 2020.

Rivalries 
Bo'ness United have a healthy rivalry with Linlithgow Rose, Both clubs are known as two of the most successful and well supported clubs from the days of the East Juniors and both moved from the Juniors to the EoSFL at the same point in 2018.

Bo'ness United  are currently in the league above Linlithgow Rose, having been promoted to the Lowland League in 2020. However, they can still face each other in some cup competitions.

Current squad
As of 11 March 2022

Season-by-season record

Junior
This list is incomplete; you can help by adding missing items with reliable sources.

Senior

† Season curtailed due to COVID-19 pandemic.

Honours
East of Scotland Football League Premier Division
Winners : 2019–20
East of Scotland League Cup
Winners: 2018-19

Scottish Junior Cup
Winners: 1947–48, 1975–76, 1983–84
Runners-up: 1946–47, 1978–79, 1982–83

Junior East Region Super League
Winners: 2009–10, 2010–11, 2013–14
Runners-up: 2014–15

Other honours
Fife & Lothians Cup winners: 1993–94, 1996–97
Edinburgh & District League winners: 1946–47, 1947–48, 1948–49, 1957–58
East Region Division One winners: 1968–69
Lothians District League Division One winners: 2002–03
East of Scotland Junior Cup winners: 1951–52, 1954–55, 1984–85, 1998–99, 2015–16
Brown Cup winners: 1978–79, 1982–83, 1983–84, 1987–88, 1996–97, 1997–98, 1998–99, 2006–07

Notable former players
The following players all went on to be capped for the Scotland national football team after playing for Bo'ness United.

 Paddy Buckley – St Johnstone and Aberdeen. Played in United's 1947–48 Scottish Junior Cup winning team.
 Donald Ford – Hearts and Falkirk.
 Alex Scott – Rangers, Everton, Hibernian and Falkirk.
 Jim Scott – Hibernian, Newcastle United, Crystal Palace, Falkirk and Hamilton. Also a Junior international cap.

References

External links
 Official website
 Unofficial club website
 Bo'ness United versus Forth Rangers (1949) (archive film from the National Library of Scotland: Scottish Screen Archive)

 
Football clubs in Scotland
Scottish Junior Football Association clubs
Football in Falkirk (council area)
Association football clubs established in 1945
1945 establishments in Scotland
East of Scotland Football League teams
Lowland Football League teams
Bo'ness